Mesorhizobium metallidurans is a gram-negative, aerobic, non-spore-forming bacteria from the genus Mesorhizobium which was isolated from root nodules of Anthyllis vulneraria in the spoil heaps from the heavy metal enriched Laurent le Minier located in the Languedoc in France.

References

Further reading

External links
Type strain of Mesorhizobium metallidurans at BacDive -  the Bacterial Diversity Metadatabase

Phyllobacteriaceae
Bacteria described in 2009